Samsung Galaxy On7 is an Android smartphone produced by Samsung Electronics that is exclusive to T-Mobile. It was unveiled and released in October 2015.
It has an advanced 64-bit class System on Chip (SoC) backed by 1.5GB RAM.

The Galaxy On7 has a 13 Megapixel rear camera with LED flash, f/2.1 aperture, auto-focus and has a front facing 5 Megapixel 85-degree(85°) wide-angle camera, which can extend up to 120-degree(120°). The camera is equipped with LED flash.

Specifications

Hardware
The phone is powered by a 64 bit Qualcomm Snapdragon 410 Quad-core 1.2 GHz Cortex-A53 processor, Adreno 306 GPU with 1.5GB RAM, 8GB of internal storage and an ample battery of 3000 mAh. The Samsung Galaxy On7 is fitted with a 5.5-inch TFT capacitive touchscreen, 16M colors display and also includes a 13 MP rear camera and 5 MP front camera.

Software

This phone is officially released with Android 6.0.1

References 

Mobile phones introduced in 2015
Samsung Galaxy